Baidu Space was an online social networking service provided by Baidu where users could record and share their lives easily. Users could also find people who have the same interests as their friends and communicate with them. It was launched on July 13, 2006. The slogan of Baidu Space is Let the world find you.

It was listed as Number 11 on the Top Social Media Sites of 2008 with 40 million unique worldwide visitors [source: November, 2008; comScore].

On April 4, 2015, Baidu announced that Baidu Space will be closed. All content on Baidu Space was transferred to Baidu Cloud on May 7, 2015.

See also
Pengyou
56.com
FaceKoo
Microdot
Internet in China

References

External links
Official website

Baidu
Chinese social networking websites
Defunct social networking services
Blog hosting services